Artem Skoropadskyi was a Ukrainian journalist, editor, activist, and press secretary of the Ukrainian nationalist organization Right Sector.

Early life and education 
Skoropadskyi was born in Moscow and studied at Moscow State University.

Career 
In 2005, Skoropadskyi moved to Ukraine and began working as a correspondant for Kommersant-Ukraine.  Two years later, he organized a rally in Sevastopol to protest the presence of Russian troops in Crimea.

During the Maidan protests in 2013, he quit journalism and became the press secretary of the nationalist group Right Sector.

In 2017, a Russian court issued an order for his arrest, and in 2020, he was wanted by the FSB for his support for Ukraine in the ongoing Russo-Ukrainian War.

Later, he worked as the chief editor of Kraina magazine.  He became a Ukrainian citizen in 2021 by decree of President Volodymyr Zelenskyy, after Skoropadskyi expressed frustration that Ukrainian law did not allow him to renounce his Russian citizenship without visiting the Russian Embassy.

Skoropadskyi authored a book titled "Two Ukraines".

After the full-scale invasion of Ukraine in 2022, Skoropadskyi organized the delivery of food to the front line.

Personal Life 
Skoropadskyi married Olena Solodovnikova after meeting her at a book signing in October 2019.

Skoropadskyi died on December 10, 2022, of a stomach illness.

References

1980s births
2022 deaths

21st-century Ukrainian journalists
Moscow State University alumni
Immigrants to Ukraine

Year of birth uncertain